Festuca idahoensis is a species of grass known by the common names Idaho fescue and blue bunchgrass. It is native to western North America, where it is widespread and common. It can be found in many ecosystems, from shady forests to open plains grasslands.

Description
This fescue is a densely clumping long-lived perennial bunch grass with stems from about 30 to 80 centimeters in height. The stiff, short, rolling leaves are mostly located near the base of the tuft. The inflorescence has hairy spikelets which produce large awned fruits. The root system is thick and penetrates deeply into the soil. The roots have symbiotic mycorrhizae. There are no rhizomes; the plant reproduces from seeds and from budding with tillers.

It is similar to, but generally taller and larger than, Poa secunda.

Ecology
The species can grow in well-soiled areas along with ponderosa pine.

This is a nutritious and preferred forage grass for wild and domestic animals. Typical native grass associates in the far west coastal prairies are Danthonia californica, Deschampsia caespitosa and Nassella pulchra.  It is a popular larval host, supporting Lindsey's skipper, sandhill skipper, Sonora skipper, woodland skipper, and western banded skipper caterpillars.

Cultivars, such as "Siskiyou Blue," are produced in the horticulture industry for landscape design and garden use.

References

Notes
 C. Michael Hogan. 2009. "Purple Needlegrass (Nassella pulchra)" Globaltwitcher.com, ed. N. Stromberg 
Jepson Manual. 1993. Jepson Manual Treatment: Festuca idahoensis

External links

Grass Manual Treatment: Festuca idahoensis
USDA Plants Profile - Festuca idahoensis 
USFS: Ecology
Festuca idahoensis - U.C. Photo gallery

idahoensis
Bunchgrasses of North America
Native grasses of California
Grasses of the United States
Grasses of Canada
Flora of Idaho
Flora of Oregon
Flora of Washington (state)
Flora of the Cascade Range
Flora of the Great Basin
Flora of the Sierra Nevada (United States)
Flora of the Klamath Mountains
Natural history of the California chaparral and woodlands
Natural history of the California Coast Ranges
Natural history of the San Francisco Bay Area
Garden plants of North America
Flora without expected TNC conservation status